Maklan, Yemen is a small village in the central highlands of Yemen. There is an airstrip which is the only access expect for a small dirt road. The main and possibly the only religion is Muslim. The city has a one classroom school run by the mosque. Maklan has a police station  but no official fire station. The city is split into a southern and northern half with farmland dividing them.

Populated places in Yemen